Jong Kum-hwa (born February 23, 1993) is a North Korean female acrobatic gymnast. With partner Kim Hye-song, Jong achieved 5th in the 2014 Acrobatic Gymnastics World Championships. With partner Pyon Yun-ae, Jong achieved 2nd in the 2018 Acrobatic Gymnastics World Championships.

References

1993 births
Living people
North Korean acrobatic gymnasts
Female acrobatic gymnasts
Medalists at the Acrobatic Gymnastics World Championships
21st-century North Korean women